Maria Kannegaard (born 6 October 1970) is a Danish-born Norwegian jazz musician and pianist. She has lived in Norway since age 10. She is known from her own Maria Kannegaard trio and cooperation with, among others Live Maria Roggen's LiveBand, Eldbjørg Raknes' Trio and TingeLing, and numerous appearances at Norwegian jazz festivals.

Career
Kannegaard was born in Copenhagen. She was educated on the Jazz program at Trondheim Musikkonsevatorium (1992–1996).
With Ole Morten Vågan (bass) and Thomas Strønen (drums) she is Maria Kannegaard Trio.

Honors
2010: Kongsberg Jazz Award
2012: NTNU-ambassadør

Discography

As leader/co-leader

Collaborations
1997: TingeLing (NorCD), with Eldbjørg Raknes’ TINGeLING
2005: Månge Röstar Talar (Bergland Productions), with Eldbjørg Raknes Trio (lyrics by Karin Boye)
2006: Survival Kit (Bergland Productions), with Siri Gjære
2007: I Live Suddenly (MYrecordings), with Eldbjørg Raknes’ 'TingeLing'
2007: Circuit Songs (Jazzland Recordings), with Live Maria Roggen
2007: Molecular Gastronomy (Rune Grammofon), with the Duo Iain Ballamy and Thomas Strønen, featuring Maria Kannegaard and Ashley Slater
2011: Monsters and Puppets (Gigafon), Duo with Thomas Strønen (drums, electronics)
2011: Song (Øra Fonogram), with Billy Fy
2013: Sidewalk Comedy (MNJ Records), with Trondheim Jazz Orchestra and Eirik Hegdal

References 

20th-century Norwegian pianists
21st-century Norwegian pianists
Norwegian jazz pianists
Danish jazz pianists
Danish women pianists
Norwegian University of Science and Technology alumni
Norwegian jazz composers
1970 births
Living people
Musicians from Copenhagen
Maria Kannegaard Trio members
TINGeLING members
ACT Music artists
Jazzland Recordings (1997) artists
20th-century women pianists
21st-century women pianists